The Odisha Police  abbreviated as either OP or OPS, is the law enforcement agency for the state of Odisha in India. It is headquartered in Cuttack, the former capital of Odisha.
The Odisha Police is headed by a Director General of Police, currently Sunil Kumar Bansal, IPS and falls under the purview of the state's Home Department of the Government of Odisha. The sanctioned personnel strength of Odisha Police is 72,145; comprising women as one-third of it total sanctioned strength in the directly recruited posts of civil constable, sub-inspector and deputy superintendent of police. This feat makes it one of the foremost in that aspect among the police services of India.

History
Along with the formation of Odisha, the "Orissa Police" was established on April 1, 1936. The department was a force comprising 4000 trained men of all ranks. The Orissa Police Manual Rules (OPMR) was unveiled in 1940 which boasted rules and regulations of the powers, functions and duties of the police department at various levels.

Department organisation

Ranges
The Odisha Police is organized into ten Police Ranges, most of which are further divided into districts. The Ranges are:
Northern Range at Sambalpur – Districts of Sambalpur, Bargarh, Bolangir, Sonepur, and Jharsuguda
Eastern Range at Balasore – Districts of Balasore, Mayurbhanj, and Bhadrak
Western Range at Rourkela – Districts of Sundargarh, and Keonjhar
Southern Range at Berhampur – Districts of Ganjam, Gajapati, and Kandhamal
North Central Range at Talcher – Districts of Dhenkanal, Angul, and Deogarh
South Western Range at Koraput – Districts of Nuapada, Koraput, Nabarangpur, Rayagada, Malkangiri, and Kalahandi
Central Range at Bhubaneswar – Districts of Bhubaneswar, Cuttack, Kendrapara, Jagatsinghpur, Jajpur, Puri, Nayagarh, and Khurda
Bhubaneswar–Cuttack Police Commissionerate at Bhubaneswar – Controls the Capital City Bhubaneswar and Twin City Cuttack
Railway Range – Used for the Indian Railways
Technical Range at Cuttack – Used for Police Transportation Services

Divisions
The Odisha Police has the following organisatorial divisions:
 Technical
 Training
 Investigation

Ranks
The Odisha Police maintains the following ranks:
 Director General of Police, IPS
 Additional Director General of Police, IPS
 Inspector General of Police, IPS
 Deputy Inspector General of Police, IPS
 Superintendent of Police, IPS / Deputy Commissioner of Police, IPS (Selection Grade)
 Superintendent of Police, OPS / Deputy Commissioner of Police, OPS (Junior Management Grade)
 Additional Superintendent of Police, IPS / Additional Deputy Commissioner of Police, IPS
 Additional Superintendent of Police, OPS / Additional Deputy Commissioner of Police, OPS
 Assistant Superintendent of Police, IPS
 Deputy Superintendent of Police, OPS / Assistant Commissioner of Police, OPS
 Inspector of Police, OP
 Sub Inspector of Police, OP
 Assistant Sub Inspector of Police, OP / Havildar Major, OP
 Head Constable / Havildar
 Lance Naik
 Constable
 Home Guard

Special Forces

Special Operation Group
The Special Operation Group (SOG) is an elite paramilitary unit specializing in neutralizing terrorists, insurgents and extremists. The force currently, is primarily being used to counter left-wing extremism.

Special Tactical Unit
The Special Tactical Unit (STU) is a dedicated urban warfare counter-terrorist force consisting of Special Operations Group (SOG) personnel who are trained alongside the National Security Guard (NSG). The force made Odisha, third state in the country, after Maharashtra and Andhra Pradesh, to have a dedicated force to counter terrorism in urban areas.

District Voluntary Force
The District Voluntary Force (DVF) is a special constabulary unit specializing in anti-Maoist operations.

Odisha Special Armed Police (OSAP)

The Odisha Special Armed Police consists of 8 Odisha Special Armed Police Battalions, 6 Specialized Indian Reserved (IR) Battalions, 4 Social Security (SS) Battalions, 2 Specialized Indian Reserved (IR) Battalions and a Special Security Battalion, working under the Bhubaneswar–Cuttack Police Commissionerate.

The Orissa Military Police was formed under the Orissa Military Police Act VII (Government of Odisha) of 1946 which was formed on the 1st of March 1946. Till 1980, the Orissa Military Police was serving the state with its two battalions i.e. the Gurkhas and the Oriyas. After the Orissa Military Police (Amendment) Act 1980, the name “Orissa Military Police’’ was changed to “Odisha Special Armed Police (OSAP)”. There after, the department has achieved numerous remarkable feats advancing regularly with latest gadgets, arms and ammunition.

Odisha Industrial Security Force (OISF)
The Odisha Industrial Police Force (OIPF) is a security force which was constituted to protect public and private sector industrial undertakings in Odisha. The force was formed under the Odisha Industrial Security Force Act of the Government of Odisha in 2012.

Odisha Auxiliary Police Force (OAPF)
Government of Odisha sanctioned altogether 5600 posts of Special Police Officers (SPOs) keeping in mind of SC and ST's employment in 2008. Currently, the force has a sanctioned strength of 1521 personnel.

Odisha Police Academies

 Armed Police Training Centre, Jharsuguda
 Basic Training Institute, Burla
 Biju Patnaik State Police Academy, Bhubaneswar
 Police Training College, Angul
 Police Training Institute, Jajpur
 Police Training School, Nayagarh
 Range Level Police Training School (RPTS), Koraput
 S.O.G. Training Centre, Chandaka, Bhubaneswar
 Urban Police & Traffic Training Institute, Bhubaneswar

Weapons and equipment

Arms

AK-47
AKM
Brügger & Thomet MP9
FN FAL
Glock 17
Heckler & Koch MP5
IMI Galil
INSAS
.303 Lee–Enfield
L1A1 Self-Loading Rifle
M4 Carbine
Pistol Auto 9mm 1A
Sig Sauer 556
SAF Carbine 2A1s
Uzi

Communication
Duplex sets
Walkie-talkies
VHF sets

Marine
5 Ton GRSE Series Fast Interceptor Boats (FIB)
12 Ton GRSE Series Fast Interceptor Boats (FIB) 
Inflatable Boats

Miscellaneous
K9 Squad

Honours

Others

Notable achievements
Odisha Police received award from National Crime Records Bureau for best implementation of Information Technology in the country. Odisha Police has also been felicitated for having the second best police station in the country.

Controversies
Odisha Police has been accused of failure to act on intelligence reports. It has also drawn flak for delay in police recruitment process. Several senior police officers have been convicted of corruption.

See also
State Armed Police Forces
Law enforcement in India

References

 
Government of Odisha
State law enforcement agencies of India
1936 establishments in India
Government agencies established in 1936